The 2014 Camellia Bowl was a post-season American college football bowl game that was played on December 20, 2014 at Cramton Bowl in Montgomery, Alabama.  The first edition of the Camellia Bowl, it featured the Bowling Green Falcons of the Mid-American Conference against the South Alabama Jaguars of the Sun Belt Conference.  The game began at 8:15 p.m. CST and aired on ESPN. It was one of the 2014–15 bowl games that concluded the 2014 FBS football season. The game was sponsored by the Raycom Media broadcasting company and was officially known as the Raycom Media Camellia Bowl.

The Jaguars accepted their invitation after finishing the regular season with a 6–6 record.  The Falcons had a record of 7–6.

Bowling Green won the game by a score of 33–28.

Team selection
The game featured the Bowling Green Falcons of the Mid-American Conference against the South Alabama Jaguars of the Sun Belt Conference.

This was the first meeting between these two teams.

Bowling Green Falcons

After the Falcons finished the season with a 7-6 record and won the MAC East Division title, they accepted their invite to the Camellia Bowl.

This was the Falcons' third bowl game in Alabama; they had previously won the 2004 GMAC Bowl over the Memphis Tigers by a score of 52–35, and later lost the 2008 GMAC Bowl to the Tulsa Golden Hurricane by a score of 63–7.  Coincidentally, the GMAC Bowl (now known as the GoDaddy Bowl) was and is played in Mobile, where South Alabama's campus is located.

South Alabama Jaguars

After the Jaguars finished the regular season with a 6-6 record, bowl director Johnny Williams extended an invitation to play in the game.

This was the first time South Alabama has ever played in a bowl game, seven years after football was approved, five years after the program kicked off, and two years after they joined the Football Bowl Subdivision.

Game summary

Scoring summary

Source:

Statistics

References

External links
Game statistics at camelliabowl.com

Camellia Bowl
Camellia Bowl
Bowling Green Falcons football bowl games
South Alabama Jaguars football bowl games
December 2014 sports events in the United States
Camellia Bowl